Mariana Canillas (born 28 December 1984) is a Paraguayan athlete. She competed in the women's discus throw at the 2000 Summer Olympics.

References

1984 births
Living people
Athletes (track and field) at the 2000 Summer Olympics
Paraguayan female discus throwers
Olympic athletes of Paraguay
Place of birth missing (living people)
21st-century Paraguayan women